Deborah Salvatrice Blando (born March 3, 1969) is an Italian-born Brazilian and Italian singer and composer. She has sold about six million copies sold worldwide, with six albums released between 1991 and 2002. She has seven number 1 single and ten Top 10 singles in Brazil, five singles in the American Hispanic market, and two of them in the Top 10 which became known in Europe, such as the pop ballad "Innocence" in 1992.

Biography 
Blando was born in Sant'Agata di Militello, the daughter of an Italian father and a Brazilian mother of Ukrainian descent, who was raised in Brazil. In 1975 she moved to Florianópolis, Brazil. At age 12, she was invited to record her first album under the pseudonym Giovanna, entitled Alegria da Gente, which was recorded completely in Italian and performed on major television shows. Her parents, however, did not allow her to pursue her career as it would disrupt her studies and thus forced her to stop. Later, she resumed her musical career working on Oswaldo Montenegro, including The Minstrels.

International career

A Different Story
In 1989, Deborah Blando was already contracted by the Sony Music Brazil and met Cyndi Lauper and her manager at the time, David Wolff. Deborah soon moved to New York City and signed with Sony Music International to release her new album A Different Story.

The first single, "Boy (Why Do You Want to Make Me Blue)", joined the American dance chart, and traded in the Coca-Cola (Diet Coke). A Different Story: Special Edition was released in 1993, including a new version for "Décadence Avec Élégance" by Lobão, and a version of "A Maçã" by Raul Seixas and Paulo Coelho. "Innocence" reached number 13 on major radio stations in Europe, and peaked at number 31 on the Australian singles chart.

In 1995, Deborah was invited by the Spanish trip hop band B-Tribe to join the album Suave Suave.
She was also invited by Coca-Cola to record the track "Seven Seas Of Rhye", the single selling one million copies in Brazil.

Unicamente
In 1997, Deborah released the CD Unicamente, which exploded onto the charts. In the same year, the single "Cat" was used as the title song for the Brazilian soap opera Malhação on the Rede Globo network. This album had the participation of renowned producers such as Patrick Leonard and David Foster.

In 1998, Blando released a new CD and once again entered the charts with the single "Somente O Sol" version of the song "I'm Not in Love". Her second single and first music video this year was "Eagles". Produced by Blando and Marc Moreau, this album became her most successful in Europe, being certified gold in Portugal.

Career changes
In 2000, Blando faced a major crisis with the recording label Virgin / EMI, generating a boycott of her songs on international radio.

Concealed by April Music back to basics with the album Salvatrice with only rewrites recent Italian with covers of Rolling Stone and Laura Pausini. At this time, she recorded "Junto Com Teu Sonho" for the Portuguese release of Where the Dream Takes You, the theme from the Walt Disney movie Atlantis: The Lost Empire.

In 2002, Universal Music released a greatest hits collection, with a bonus with five previously unreleased tracks.

Ronan Keating
In 2003, she recorded the Brazilian cover of "When You Say Nothing at All". The single reached the top 10 in the Latin charts. Her duet of the song in English with Irish singer Ronan Keating was a great success in the UK.

Decline and withdrawal from media
Blando suffers from bipolar disorder and this greatly hindered her career. She decided to leave her career aside to move back to London and study Kadampa Buddhism to search for inner peace. With Blando's illness, her musical projects were left to the background as she sought treatment.

Polares
Even through a personal crisis, Blando found the strength to polish an electronic music album, combining house, psy-trance, and ballads with the influence of trip hop. The album was recorded during her stint in the United States and Mexico. Ready at the end of 2007, it contains 16 tracks and is made in partnership with her friend Alexander Green. The album mixes are on account of total DJs Claudio Ferreira Audiocactos and Sandrinho "Sanschwartz", who brought to the work house and psy-trance elements. Polares moves in two worlds, a dance-based electronic music and other melancholy, with elements such as acoustic piano, strings and guitar. The singer interprets the songs in English and Portuguese, with the songs "Agreement Signed" and "Every Minute" being included on the soundtrack of national and international TV Globo soap opera Seven Sins.

Discography

Albums

Greatest hits albums

Singles

Soundtrack

Tours 
 A Different Story (1992)
 M200 Summer Concerts (1994)
 Unicamente Tour (1997)
 Self-titled Album "Deborah Blando" Tour (1998)
 A Luz Que Acende O Olhar (2002)
 Acústico Deborah Blando (2011)
 Remember Tour (2012)

References

External links
Official website  

1969 births
Living people
People from the Province of Messina
Brazilian people of Ukrainian descent
Brazilian people of Sicilian descent
Brazilian women pop singers
English-language singers from Brazil
20th-century Brazilian women singers
20th-century Brazilian singers
Italian emigrants to Brazil
21st-century Brazilian women singers
21st-century Brazilian singers